Jinzhou railway station is a railway station in Jinzhou, Liaoning, China. It is the eastern terminus of the Jinzhou–Chengde railway.

Railway stations in Liaoning
Stations on the Jinzhou–Chengde railway